Christos Xenitopoulos (born 1 June 1990) is a Greek footballer, who currently plays for Ethnikos Piraeus in the Football League 2 as a left back.

References
Christos Xenitopoulos
Christos Xenitopoulos
Transfers 2012-2013

1990 births
Living people
Greek footballers
Ethnikos Piraeus F.C. players
Association football defenders
Footballers from Serres